Edward Salwey (born 1603) was an English lawyer and politician who sat in the House of Commons  in 1659.

Salwey was the son of Humphrey Salwey of Stanford Court, Stanford-on-Teme and his wife Anne Littleton, daughter  of Sir Edward Littleton. He matriculated at Brasenose College, Oxford on 10 November 1621 aged 18. He was called to the bar at Inner Temple in 1635.  In 1656 he was commissioner for assessment for Worcestershire. In 1659, he was elected Member of Parliament for Droitwich in the Third Protectorate Parliament.

Salwey married  Dorothy Dryden, daughter of Sir Erasmus Dryden, 1st Baronet of Canons Ashby House,  Northamptonshire. His daughter Elizabeth married Francis Winnington.

References

1603 births
Year of death missing
English MPs 1659
Politicians from Worcestershire
Members of the Inner Temple